Brute is a fictional character appearing in American comic books published by Marvel Comics. He is Counter-Earth's version of Mister Fantastic.

Publication history
The Reed Richards of Counter-Earth first appeared in Marvel Premiere #2 (May 1972), and was created by Roy Thomas and Gil Kane.

The character subsequently appears as The Brute in The Power of Warlock #6-7 (June, August 1973), Fantastic Four #175-179 (October 1976-February 1977), #181-183 (April–June 1977), Fantastic Four Unlimited #3 (September 1993), Paradise X: Heralds #1-2 (December 2001-January 2002), and Fantastic Four #47 (November 2001), and #49 (January 2002).

The Brute received an entry in the Marvel Legacy: The 1970s Handbook #1 (2006), and the Official Handbook of the Marvel Universe A to Z HC vol. #2 (2008).

Fictional character biography
Brute is a version of Reed Richards from a world created by the High Evolutionary called Counter-Earth. He was exposed to cosmic rays that initially did not affect him; Johnny Storm and Ben Grimm were unaffected, and Susan Storm was left in a comatose state. The cosmic rays eventually gave him the ability to transform into a savage purple-skinned behemoth called the Brute. The Brute became evil after being hit on the head with a metallic cylinder.

The Brute made his way to True Earth, where he joined the Frightful Four to beat the Fantastic Four, Thundra and Tigra. Later, the Impossible Man inadvertently freed the Fantastic Four, who overcame the Frightful Four. During the ensuing fight, the Brute managed to trap the original Reed Richards in the Negative Zone and replace him. Once accepted as the leader of the Fantastic Four, he sent the Human Torch and the Thing into the Negative Zone and battled with Invisible Girl. However, the remaining trio made it back from the Negative Zone with the help of Annihilus who lost his Cosmic Rod to Mad Thinker's Awesome Android. After seeing Reed Richard's selfless dedication to his wife, the concussion that made the Brute evil wore off and he sacrificed himself to keep the original Reed Richards' promise to return the cosmic Rod to Annihilus.

Brute was glimpsed when Abraxas scanned through the alternate Earths. As Abraxas assaulted Mister Fantastic, he told him "as you die on this Earth, so do your other selves across the realities". Brute was shown among the Reed Richards to be among the victims of Abraxas' attack. During the "Avengers: Standoff!" storyline, Brute was an inmate of Pleasant Hill, a gated community established by S.H.I.E.L.D.

Powers and abilities
Richards can transform at will into the Brute, who possesses an 8–9 foot tall form with vast strength and durability. In addition, he retained his counterpart's brilliant scientific mind. Brute has the skill in manipulating people, especially to others thinking he is the Reed Richards of their respective reality. At one point, he was able to absorb geothermal energies from Earth's core, thus increasing his own power. In this form, he could fire energy blasts.

Other versions
The Brute makes an appearance in the tie-in comic Spider-Man Unlimited. In this continuum, a Counter-Earth version of Reed and his friends were bombarded by cosmic rays like their counterparts. Reed became a creature known as The Brute, Sue ended up in a coma, Johnny was dead, and only Ben was unaffected. Using his good standing with the High Evolutionary as Reed Richards (who tries to maintain his secret identity by putting up a snobby front), Brute secretly aids the Counter-Earth rebels against them. Ben Grimm helps out by gathering data held by The High Evolutionary.

References

External links
 

Alternative versions of comics characters
Characters created by Gil Kane
Characters created by Roy Thomas
Comics characters introduced in 1972
Fictional characters with energy-manipulation abilities
Fictional characters with fire or heat abilities
Fictional characters with superhuman durability or invulnerability
Marvel Comics characters who are shapeshifters
Marvel Comics characters with superhuman strength
Marvel Comics male supervillains
Marvel Comics mutates
Marvel Comics supervillains